Juan Carlos “Juanca” Pineda Torres (born 12 January 2000) is a Dominican professional footballer who plays as a midfielder for Spanish club Burgos CF Promesas and the Dominican Republic national team.

International career
Pineda first represented the Dominican Republic at the 2018 CONCACAF U-20 Championship. He made his senior international debut in 2021.

References

External links

https://int.soccerway.com/players/juan-carlos-pineda-torres/569883/

2000 births
Living people
People from Azua Province 
Dominican Republic footballers
Association football midfielders
Dominican Republic international footballers
Dominican Republic emigrants to Spain
Naturalised citizens of Spain
Spanish footballers
CD Mirandés B players
Segunda Federación players
Tercera División players
Burgos CF Promesas players